Somme is a rural locality in the Southern Downs Region, Queensland, Australia. In the  Somme had a population of 53 people.

Geography
Somme is bounded by the Severn River to the east and south and the land to the south and east is mostly used for farming and residential purposes. The land in the north-western part of Somme is mostly undeveloped.

History
Somme was named after the Battle of the Somme in northern France. It was one of the largest battles for the Australian Imperial Forces in World War I. It is one of a number of localities in the Southern Downs Regions named after World War I battles.

Somme State School opened circa 1917. In 1924 it went from being a full-time school to being a half-time school in conjunction with Apple Vale State School in Apple Vale (meaning they shared a single teacher). Both schools closed in August 1927. Somme State School was on the south-west corner of the junction of Somme Lane and an unnamed street.

Somme State School opened on 22 February 1949 and closed in 1962. It is unclear if this was a reopening of the earlier school or a new school, a 1952 shows Somme State School as being near Somme Lane but does not pinpoint its location as precisely as the 1922 map.

In the  Somme had a population of 53 people.

Education
There are no schools in Somme. The nearest primary school is in neighbouring Ballandean and the nearest secondary school is in Stanthorpe.

References

External links

Southern Downs Region
Localities in Queensland